There have been 81 women in the New South Wales Legislative Assembly since its establishment in 1856. Women have had the right to vote in the assembly since 1902 and the right to stand as a candidate since 1918.

The first successful candidate for the Legislative Assembly was Millicent Preston-Stanley, who was elected as a Nationalist representative for the multi-member electorate of Eastern Suburbs in 1925, but only lasted one term before being defeated. Fourteen years later, Mary Quirk held the seat of Balmain for Labor after the death of her husband, becoming the first Labor woman in the Assembly. However, successful women candidates in the Legislative Assembly remained few and far between until the 1980s.

In the early 1980s, women began to break through into senior positions in the state; Janice Crosio became the first woman to serve as a minister in state parliament, serving in the Wran Labor ministry, and she was followed on the conservative side of politics by Rosemary Foot, who served as the deputy leader of the Liberal Party for a time. In 1996, Liberal Kerry Chikarovski became the first woman to lead a major party in New South Wales, although she was deposed in 2003.

In 2009, Labor's Kristina Keneally became the first woman to serve as Premier of New South Wales. Both the offices of Premier and Deputy Premier were held by women from 2009 until 2011, the first in Australian history. In 2011, Shelley Hancock was elected as the first female Speaker of the Legislative Assembly. In 2017, Gladys Berejiklian became the first Liberal woman to be elected as Premier of New South Wales and first female Liberal premier of any Australian state.

While there had been a number of women elected to the Legislative Council throughout the middle of the twentieth century, it was only at the 1988 state election that numbers began to grow in the Legislative Assembly. Seven women had been elected in the previous 132 years; six more joined them the 1988 election. Numbers have improved substantially in recent years, with women now occupying 27 Assembly seats in the current parliament. Linda Burney is the only Indigenous Australian woman to have been elected to the New South Wales Parliament.

List of women in the New South Wales Legislative Assembly

Names in bold indicate women who have been appointed as Ministers and Parliamentary Secretaries during their time in Parliament. Names in italics indicate entry into Parliament through a by-election and * symbolises members that have sat as members in both the Legislative Assembly and the Legislative Council.

Timeline

Proportion of women in the Assembly
Numbers and proportions are as they were directly after the relevant election and do not take into account by-elections, defections or other changes in membership. The Liberal column also includes that party's predecessors, the Nationalist, United Australia and Democratic parties.

References

 
New South Wales